Każdemu wolno kochać (Anybody Can Love) is a 1933 Polish romantic comedy film directed by Mieczysław Krawicz and produced by the Rex-Film studio.

Cast
 Ludwik Lawiński as dyrektor teatru
 Stanisława Kawińska as Weronika
 Janina Brochwiczówna as gwiazda rewiowa
 Józef Kondrat as widz w teatrze
 Henryk Małkowski as dozorca
 Ludwik Fritsche as professor Robaczek
 Mariusz Maszyński as Alojzy Kędziorek
 Liliana Zielińska as Renia
 Feliks Chmurkowski as gość u Renaty
 Czesław Skonieczny as Maciej Baleron
 Mira Zimińska as Lodzia
 Józef Orwid as właściciel kamienicy
 Adolf Dymsza as Hipek
 Witold Conti as Gwiazdor rewiowy
 Stanisław Łapiński as Burmistrz

References

External links
 

1933 films
1933 romantic comedy films
1930s Polish-language films
Polish black-and-white films
Films directed by Mieczysław Krawicz
Polish romantic comedy films